Back to Light is the fifth studio album from Bomb The Bass, the Electronica  collective formed around British producer and musician, Tim Simenon. Released in 2010, the album is produced by Bomb The Bass in association with Gui Boratto.

Track listing

Personnel
Artwork By [Sleeve Optics] – Lopetz 10
Mastered By – Simon Francis
Mixed By – Foppe Talman, Tim Simenon
Producer – Gui Boratto (tracks: 1 to 9), Martin Gore (tracks: 10), Paul Conboy, Tim Simenon

References

External links
   Back To Light on Discogs.com

2010 albums
Bomb the Bass albums
Studio !K7 albums
Albums produced by Tim Simenon